The Shekak or Shakkak is a Kurdish tribe present in various regions, mainly in West Azerbaijan province, Iran.

History

The Shikaki tribe are first mentioned in a Yezidi mişûr (manuscript) from 1207 AD, where they're mentioned as one of the tribes affiliated to Pir Sini Darani, who is a Yezidi saint represented in the Yezidi religion as the Lord of the sea.

In the Sharafnama, they are mentioned twice. First, in the chapter on the emirate of Bohtan, as being one of the four tribes living in Finik. Second, in the chapter on the Ayyubid emirate of Hasankeyf.

In a 16th-century Ottoman Defter, they are mentioned in the regions of Birecik, Kahta, Joum, Suruç and Ravendan, and called 'Taife-I Ekrâd-I Shikakî'. In another Defter, they are mentioned in the region of Çemişgezek.

Among the clans of the Shekak are the 'Awdoǐ or Evdoyî. According to their oral history they came from Diyarbakır in the 17th century and settled west of Lake Urmia, which displaced the Donboli tribe.

The first known chieftain of the 'Awdoǐ was Ismail Agha, who died in 1816 and whose tomb is beside the Naslu River. His grandson Jafar Agha was executed as a bandit in Tabriz in 1905. Jafar's brother Simko Shikak was responsible for leading the anti-Christian and anti-Alevi massacres in the area before and during World War I, and for the organised resistance against the regime of Reza Shah.

The Shaqaqi tribe has been described as brave warriors and they trained officers of soldiers of the Qajar dynasty since the reign of Agha Mohammad Khan Qajar.

Spread 
The tribe inhabits the villages of Akçakuşak, Çevrimli, Düğünyurdu, Koçtepe and Yatağankaya in the Şırnak Province of Turkey. It moreover inhabits multiple villages in Tunceli Province.

Turkicized Shiite portions of the tribe historically inhabited East Azerbaijan.

Leaders
Ismail Agha (d. 1816 or 1820)
Ali Khan 
Mehmed Agha
Timur (Teymûr) Agha
Jafar Agha (d. 1905)
Simko Agha (b. 1887 d. 1930)

References

Kurdish tribes
West Azerbaijan Province
Şırnak Province